20F or 20-F may refer to:
 Fluorine-20 (F-20 or 20F), an isotope of fluorine
 Form 20-F, an SEC filing

See also
 F20 (disambiguation)